Dhimitraq Goga Sports Palace is a purpose-built basketball arena built in 2018 in Xhafzotaj, Durrës, Albania

History
The arena was built by Goga Basket's owner and locals businessman Perikli Goga on a site in Xhafzotaj owned by Diamant Logistics, also owned by Perikli Goga. The arena is part of the Dhimitraq Goga Sport Centre, which includes 2 basketball courts, 2 outdoor basketball courts and an outdoor tennis court. The 2 indoor courts are made up of the main arena and salla B (hall B), the latter of which was inaugurated on 17 September 2017 in a friendly between Goga Basket women's and ZKK Lovćen which ended 73–45 to Goga Basket.

References

Indoor arenas in Albania
Basketball venues in Albania
Buildings and structures in Durrës